DingTalk is an enterprise communication and collaboration platform developed by Alibaba Group. It was founded in 2014 and headquartered in Hangzhou. By 2018, it was one of the world's largest professional communication and management mobile apps in China with over 100 million users. International market intentions were announced in 2018. DingTalk provides iOS and Android apps as well as Mac and PC clients.

History 
On January 16, 2015, DingTalk launched the testing version 1.1.0.

On May 26, 2015, V2.0 was released, adding Ding Mail, Smart OA and shared storage.

On September 19, 2016, V3.0 was released, focusing on B2B communication and collaboration.

On January 15, 2018, DingTalk launched the English version of its application in Malaysia, its first market outside of China (although it can be downloaded and used in other markets such as Bangladesh, US, etc.).  At the same time, DingTalk noted that in November 2017 it had launched hardware devices such as the “smart receptionist” that enables employee check-in by fingerprint or facial recognition.

During the COVID-19 pandemic in Wuhan, the app was the target of review bomb after it was used to send homework to quarantined school children.

On April 8, 2020, DingTalk Lite was released on various app stores across key Asian markets, including Japan, Indonesia, Malaysia, and other countries and regions. DingTalk Lite comes with necessary features such as messaging, file sharing, and video conferencing. It supports video-conferencing for over 300 people simultaneously and a live-broadcast function for more than 1000 participants. The app offers AI-enabled translation of messages in 14 languages including Chinese, Japanese, English.

Features 

 All messaging types including text messages, voice messages, pictures, files, DingMails. The Unique Read/Unread Mode is to improve communication efficiency and messages can be delivered with DING, which can alert the recipients through phone call, SMS, and the app itself.
 All organizational contacts are unified into one online platform
 Audio conference call support for up to 30 parties
 SmartWork OA for managing internal workflows such as employee leaves, travel applications, and reimbursement. Records can be summed up and exported. In the future, more 3rd party applications and functions will be integrated.
 DingTalk is one of the first Chinese apps to have obtained the ISO/IEC 27001:2013 standard. Data are encrypted at SSL/TLS security standards.
 Smart hardware C1 and M2, "smart" applications

See also 

 Comparison of cross-platform instant messaging clients
Comparison of instant messaging protocols
Comparison of Internet Relay Chat clients
Comparison of LAN messengers
Comparison of VoIP software
List of SIP software
List of video telecommunication services and product brands

References

External links 
 Official Website

Alibaba Group
Instant messaging clients
IOS software
Android (operating system) software